Ghulam Arieff Tipoo (born 28 August 1931) is a Bangladeshi jurist, freedom fighter and language movement activist. He is the Chief Prosecutor of the International Crimes Tribunal, a domestic war crimes tribunal in Bangladesh set up to investigate and prosecute suspects for the genocide committed during the Bangladesh Liberation War.

1952 Language Movement in Rajshahi area was organized mainly under his leadership. He was the joint convener of Rastrabhasa Sangram Parishad in that area. In recognition of his contribution to the Bengali language movement, the government of Bangladesh awarded him the country's second highest civilian award Ekushey Padak in 2019.

Early life
Tipoo was born on 28 August 1931 at Kamalakantapur village of Shibganj Upazila in Chapainawabganj of the then British India (now Bangladesh). He was the second son among the 9 children of his parents. He completed his Secondary School Certificate from Kaliachar school in 1948 and Higher Secondary School Certificate from Rajshahi College in 1950. He graduated from the same college in 1952. He earned his post graduation degree from Dhaka University. He was the General Secretary of Bangladesh Students Union from 1954 to 1956.

Career
Tipoo started his career as a lawyer in 1958. He served as the President of Rajshahi Advocate Bar Association. He was one of the senate and syndicate members of Rajshahi University. He was also on the committee of Bangladesh Bar Council.

Personal life
Tipoo is married to Jahan Ara Chowdhury Lui; the couple have three daughters and one son.

References

1931 births
Living people
People from Chapai Nawabganj district
University of Dhaka alumni
Rajshahi College alumni
Bengali language movement activists
Recipients of the Ekushey Padak
Bangladeshi jurists